The Idhaya Engineering College for Women is an all women's Catholic engineering college founded in 2001 by the Franciscan Sisters of the Immaculate Heart of Mary Congregation, Pondicherry.  Offering Bachelor of Engineering and Bachelor of Technology degrees, the campus is located in Chinnasalem, Kallakurichi district, Tamil Nadu. It is approved by the All India Council for Technical Education and affiliated to Anna University, Chennai.

References

External links

Franciscan universities and colleges
Catholic universities and colleges in India
Women's engineering colleges in India
Women's universities and colleges in Tamil Nadu
Engineering colleges in Tamil Nadu
Education in Viluppuram district
Educational institutions established in 2001
2001 establishments in Tamil Nadu